Penicillium canariense is a fungus species of the genus of Penicillium.

See also
List of Penicillium species

References 

canariense
Fungi described in 2002